The 2013–14 season was Leeds United A.F.C.'s fourth consecutive season in the second tier of English football. The season began on 3 August 2013 and ended on 3 May 2014.

Review
Leeds began the season in the same strong form that helped them avoid relegation the previous year, and by Christmas Day were in the play-off places, leaving fans cautiously optimistic that Brian McDermott might be the man to take them back into the top-flight after a decade away. As had become all-too familiar for the club, however, off-field events saw their promotion challenge quickly unravel. GFH Capital, who had purchased the club the previous year, announced that they did not have the funds to continue running the club long-term, and eventually sold Leeds to maverick Italian owner Massimo Cellino, who immediately ran afoul of the Football Association's fit and proper persons test due to a past criminal conviction. 

The uncertainty had a clear effect on the field, with Leeds' form collapsing dramatically, eventually leading to a farcial episode where McDermott was sacked, only to be reinstated a few days later. The team won only three games in-between Christmas Day and April 8, before a late flurry of ten points from their final five matches stabilized their league position (though they would have survived even had they not gained any points from these games, largely thanks to the dismal form of the bottom four sides). However, this was not enough to save McDermott's job, and he parted company with Leeds shortly after the season ended, with club captain Ross McCormack, whose goals were largely credited with helping Leeds avoid a serious relegation struggle, handing in a transfer request shortly thereafter.

Events
This is a list of the significant events to occur at the club during the 2013–14 season, presented in chronological order, starting on 4 May 2013 and ending on the final day of the club's final match in the 2013–14 season. This list does not include transfers or new contracts, which are listed in the transfers section below, or match results, which are in the results section.

August
11 August: Rodolph Austin replaces Lee Peltier as Club Captain.

October
21 October: Ryan Hall is suspended from the club for two weeks pending an investigation into a disciplinary issue

November
30 November: English consortium granted exclusive period for significant investment in club by GFH Capital.

January
7 January: The club confirms the group which will acquire a majority shareholding in Leeds United is Sport Capital.
10 January: Leeds United announce strategic partnership with San Francisco 49ers of the NFL.
16 January: Ross McCormack is named as new Club Captain, replacing Rodolph Austin, who was appointed club captain at the start of the season – who stepped down from the role following the 6–0 defeat against Sheffield Wednesday.
30 January: The takeover of Sport Capital collapses after some of the consortium's backers didn't feel able to deliver the financial backing.However, GFH Capital confirm they are in continual discussions regarding the introduction of new investment into Leeds United.

February
1 February 2014: GFH Capital confirm that it has agreed to sell a 75 per cent stake in the club to Eleonora Sport Ltd, a company owned by Massimo Cellino.
4 February 2014: Enterprise Insurance, the club's shirt sponsor, file a winding-up petition over an alleged unpaid debt understood to be about £1.5 million.
7 February 2014: GFH Capital exchanged contracts for the sale of 75 per cent of the club to Eleonora Sport Ltd, subject to Football League approval. GFH Capital and its investors will retain a 25 per cent stake in Leeds United.
27 February 2014: Enterprise Insurance withdraw winding-up petition after the club are understood to have repaid around £1.6 million to Enterprise Insurance, with the hearing at the High Court on 17 March cancelled.

March
24 March 2014: After Massimo Cellino was found to be guilty of an offence under Italian tax legislation to the non-payment of import duties of a boat, The Football League disqualified Cellino from taking over the club. Leeds United's Board and Executive Management announced they will continue discussions with the Football League and Eleonora Sport to find a solution that is suitable to all parties.
27 March 2014: The legal representatives of Massimo Cellino lodged an appeal against The Football League’s decision that he is subject to a disqualifying condition under its Owners’ and Directors’ Test.
28 March 2014: After the club failed to pay the players on time, the Leeds United players agreed to defer part of their wages for March.

April
5 April 2014: After an independent Queen's Counsel overturned the decision made by The Football League to disqualify Massimo Cellino, Massimo Cellino was granted approval to complete the purchase of a majority stake in Leeds United, subject to FL Approval. The approval will see Eleonora Sport take a 75% stakeholding in the club while former majority shareholders GFH Capital and investors retain 25%.
8 April 2014: Leeds United post £9.5 million loss for the 2012–13 financial year. Massimo Cellino completes his takeover of Leeds United having agreed a deal to buy a 75% stake in the club, according to his lawyers.
10 April 2014: The Football League ratified Massimo Cellino's takeover of Leeds United, allowing Cellno to become a Director of the club.
11 April 2014: David Haigh resigns as Managing Director.

May
3 May 2014: Leeds United finish the 2013–14 Championship season 15th, on 57 points.

Players

First team squad information

Appearances (starts and substitute appearances) and goals include those in the Championship (and playoffs), League One (and playoffs), FA Cup, League Cup and Football League Trophy.
1Player made fifty eight appearances (scoring six goals) for the club during his first spell at the club

Transfers

In

Loans In

Loans Out

Out

New contracts

1Contracts come into effect Summer 2014

Pre-season

Competitions

Overall summary

Championship

Results summary

Results by round

Championship

FA Cup

League Cup

Awards

Internal Awards

Official Player of the Year Awards

The results of the 2013–14 Leeds United A.F.C. Player of the Year Awards were announced at a dinner on 3 May 2014 at Elland Road.

 Fans' Player of the Year: Ross McCormack
 Young Player of the Year: Alex Mowatt
 Players' Player of the Year: Ross McCormack
 Goal of the Season: Ross McCormack (vs Sheffield Wednesday, 17 August)
 Fastest Goal of the Season: Matt Smith (vs Huddersfield Town, 26 October)
 Community Player of the Year: Matt Smith

References

Leeds United F.C. seasons
Leeds United
Foot